Laurel is a city in Maryland, United States, located midway between Washington, D.C. and Baltimore on the banks of the Patuxent River. While the city limits are entirely in northern Prince George's County, outlying developments extend into Anne Arundel, Montgomery and Howard counties. Founded as a mill town in the early 19th century, Laurel expanded local industry and was later able to become an early commuter town for Washington and Baltimore workers following the arrival of the Baltimore and Ohio Railroad in 1835.  Largely residential today, the city maintains a historic district centered on its Main Street, highlighting its industrial past.

The Department of Defense is a prominent presence in the Laurel area today, with the Fort Meade Army base, the NSA and Johns Hopkins' Applied Physics Laboratory all located nearby. Laurel Park, a thoroughbred horse racetrack, is located just outside the city limits.

History

Natural history
Many dinosaur fossils from the Cretaceous Era are preserved in a  park in Laurel. The site, which among other finds has yielded fossilized teeth from Astrodon and Priconodon species, has been called the most prolific in the eastern United States. From the Late Glacial age in 10,700 B.C. to 8,500 B.C., Laurel's climate warmed and changed from a spruce forest to a hardwood forest. In the Late Archaic period from 4,000 to 1,000 B.C., Laurel would have been covered primarily with an oak and hickory forest.

Pre-20th century
Laurel was formed from land on the fall line of the Patuxent River patented by the Snowden family in 1658 as part of the 12,250-acre New Birmingham plantation, which included the later Montpelier. The Washington Turnpike Road Company built Route 1 between 1796 and 1812, creating a major north–south land route. Milstead's Hotel halfway house was built in town to serve four stage lines a day in 1816. Nicholas Snowden built a grist mill on the site circa 1811 which grew to a small cotton mill by the 1820s.
In 1828, a detailed survey was conducted to build a canal from Baltimore to Georgetown to connect to the proposed C&O canal. The route from Elkridge Landing to Bladensburg would have built a waterway roughly aligning with modern U.S. Route 1 and Kenilworth Avenue, with special consideration not to harm the water power for Savage Mill. The project did not go forward; the preference was to build a railroad, the B&O. Nicholas Snowden died in 1831, and the mill properties transferred to Louisa Snowden and her husband Horace Capon in 1834. In 1835, coinciding with the opening of the Capital Subdivision
rail line from Baltimore to Washington, the Patuxent Manufacturing Company was chartered by Horace Capon, Edward Snowden, Theodore Jenkins, W.C. Shaw, A.E. Hall, and O.C. Tiffany and the mill expanded greatly with the addition of the Avondale Mill building in 1844. Mill president Horace Capron with his partners built housing for close to 300 workers, and a bigger cotton mill. Cotton duck from the mill was shipped down what would become Laurel's Main Street, then by rail to Baltimore. A substantial dam was built in 1850. As a mill town, Laurel was somewhat unusual in Prince George's County and was surrounded by agricultural endeavors.

The community was originally known as "Laurel Factory", named for its laurel trees, when Edward Snowden became the first postmaster in 1837 and was a true company town, with a school and shops, and many of the mill workers' homes owned until the 1860s by the company.  During the 1840s, three historic churches in the community—the Methodist est. 1842, St. Mary of the Mills (Roman Catholic) est. 1845, and St. Philip's (Episcopal) est. 1839—established what are still vigorous congregations.  During the Civil War, Laurel Factory, like much of Maryland, was a divided community, but with many Southern sympathizers.  Union soldiers patrolled the railroad, and for a time there was also a Union hospital.  During the latter half of the 19th century, while it still operated its factories, manufacturing played a less important role in the community.  Laurel evolved into an early suburban town.  Many of its residents commuted by rail to jobs in Washington or Baltimore. The town was incorporated in 1870 and reincorporated in 1890 to coincide with a new electric power plant and paved streets and boarded sidewalks. By this time, the town had grown to a population of 2,080, and the city banned livestock from the streets.

In 1870, the Patuxent Bank of Laurel was founded on the corner of Main Street and Washington Avenue. In 1874 a delegation was sent to Annapolis to introduce legislation to make Laurel its own county of 10,000 residents with land from Prince George's, Howard, and Anne Arundel counties. In 1879 Laurel Academy of Music was built along Route 1. The building was converted to a movie theatre in 1915, with a parking garage on the lower floor of the wood structure; it burned in 1917, and Academy Ford built on the same site in the late 20th century. In 1888 inventor David J. Weems tested an unmanned electric train on a two-mile banked circular track near Laurel Station. The three-ton vehicle reached speeds of up to 120 mph for twenty minutes.

In 1890, Citizens National Bank opened its doors on Main Street, as Prince George's County's first nationally chartered bank. Charles H. Stanley was the bank's first president, and it remained independently managed and with the same name until acquired by PNC Financial Services in 2007. Branch services are still provided from the original building. Along with those branch services being provided, there have been an additional 5 branches that were implemented.

At the turn of the century, Louis Barret operated a hotel called the "Half Way House", later called the Milstead Hotel, which served as a stop for the four stage lines operating between Baltimore and Washington. In 1898, a stable fire spread to the 100-year-old hotel and burned adjacent buildings along Main Street. With only bucket brigades, Mayor Phelps telegraphed Baltimore to send a special train with fireman, horses, and engine number 10. One fireman was crushed by the rolling fire engine, and returned in a casket saved from the burning mortuary. The resulting losses inspired efforts to bring water and fire apparatus to the town. The town was struck again by the great Laurel fire of December 14, 1899, when a twelve-building fire destroyed the Laurel Presbyterian Church (known then as Presbyterian Church at Laurel).

Proposed in 1897, Laurel's seven-term mayor Edward Phelps succeeded in constructing the first high school in Prince George's County in 1899, despite several financial obstacles, by personally assuming the financial risks in doing so. The original building built for $5,000, now known as the Phelps Community Center, still stands at the northeast corner of Montgomery and Eighth Streets. It was listed on the National Register of Historic Places in 1979.

20th century
In 1902, the City and Suburban Railway with the City and Suburban and Washington, Berwyn, and Laurel railway started single line electric trolley service.

The Laurel Sanitarium was built in 1905 on a  farm that comprised what is now Laurel Lakes. The facility's purpose was to care for people with nervous diseases, alcohol, and drug addiction. Five buildings that were joined to a central administration building included 8-, 14-, 30-, and 36-room facilities for men and women.

Laurel Park Racecourse, a thoroughbred racetrack, opened in 1911 and remains in operation. In the book, Seabiscuit: An American Legend, Laurel is mentioned several times as an important horse racing venue. Laurel also hosted a horse trotter (harness racing) track named Freestate Raceway from 1948 to 1990; it was located in Howard County on the west side of US Route 1, south of Savage in an area that now includes a CarMax dealership, Weis supermarket, and a strip mall.

In March 1912, the city agreed to take out $35,000 in loans to build its first sewer system with twelve miles of line that terminated by dumping into the Patuxent River.

In February 1913, Laurel was a stopping point in the Suffrage hike led by Rosalie Gardiner Jones. She was joined by a Laurel-based colored women's suffrage group and sent a parcel with a flag and message ahead to President-elect Wilson.

Board track racing came to Laurel in 1925 when a  wood oval track was built by Jack Prince and featured 48-degree banked turns. The Washington-Baltimore automobile speedway was short-lived, with featured races of 16 drivers at a time. Despite crowds of up to 30,000, receipts did not cover the $400,000 cost of building the track on the 364-acre Avondale property which fell into receivership in 1926.

Natural gas service was extended to the community in 1929.

In 1931, "Angy Gerrin" built a 7,000-seat amphitheater next to the Duvall Farm between Laurel Park and Route One for an outdoor boxing venue. His company, Mid City Boxing Club Inc, held several events with low turnouts and receipts confiscated by local police. It was sold the same year to C.E. Cornell, who called it "Twin Cities Arena" or "Mid City Arena". The arena was active through 1932 with the entire delegation of the National Boxing Association attending a fight with Governor Ritchie in attendance. After watching the match and calling a fight to be halted in five rounds, the delegation announced efforts to drop junior lightweight and junior welterweight classes to discourage matches between young opponents. Operations ceased by the end of the 1933 season in the peak of the depression.

Prohibition in the United States was repealed in 1934. Wasting little time, the Prince Georges Brewing Company planned a $500,000 brewery on 100 acres next to Laurel Park, but did not follow through.

In 1954, Johns Hopkins Applied Physics Laboratory built its campus west of Laurel in Howard County, using a Laurel address.

By 1960, Laurel anticipated massive growth from Fort Meade and NSA. The town still used the Patuxent River to drain sewage, and filed urban grants for water and sewage infrastructure. 5,000 houses were planned in the adjacent 1,200-acre Maryland City development. City Planner Harry Susini anticipated the National Capitol Planning Commission would use clustered development to prevent tightly massed population in Laurel by the year 2000.

In the late 1960s, the county was at the peak of racial tensions. The situation peaked in Laurel in July 1967 when four men and a juvenile, affiliated with the KKK, attempted to burn St. Mark's United Methodist Church and then a private residence in the predominantly African-American neighborhood of the Grove, prompting protests and police blockades. Due to cross-burning incidents, a Ku Klux Klan march, and several arsons and suspected arsons, temporary police barricades were erected throughout late July to prevent white residents from entering the Grove. In August 1967, it was announced that the city would re-purchase a privately owned swimming pool, which had been sold to a private club in 1949. The pool, which had only been available to white residents, was to be operated as an integrated public facility open to all.

On May 15, 1972, Governor George Wallace of Alabama, running for the presidential nomination of the Democratic Party, was campaigning at a rally in the parking lot of Laurel Shopping Center, near what is today a Bank of America branch, when he was shot and paralyzed by Arthur Bremer, a disturbed, out-of-work janitor (see An Assassin's Diary).

On June 22, 1972, Laurel was impacted severely by Hurricane Agnes, which caused the greatest flooding ever recorded in Maryland. Several bridges were destroyed and the nearby T. Howard Duckett Dam at Rocky Gorge Reservoir was at capacity and posed a huge threat. In 1975, the city council passed ordinances to create a historic district around Main Street.

In 1982, developer Kingdon Gould III bought 3,539 acres of Laurel property (539 in North Laurel) in two deals for $15 million. The largest parcel lies between Laurel and Beltsville and is being developed under the name Konterra, buoyed by access to major highways via the construction of Maryland Route 200.

The Elizabeth House, a nonprofit food pantry and soup kitchen, was founded in 1988 to serve low-income residents of the Laurel area. This later grew to include emergency financial aid and transportation.

A former 1840s mill workers' home on the northeast corner of 9th and Main Streets was renovated and opened as the Laurel Museum on May 1, 1996.  The museum features exhibits that highlight the history of Laurel and its citizens.  A gift shop is available, and museum admission is free.  The museum's John Calder Brennan Library is open to researchers by appointment.

21st century
On September 24, 2001, a tornado passed through Laurel and left F3 property damage, including significant roof damage to the Laurel High School and the historic Harrison-Beard building.

Prior to the September 11, 2001, attacks, all five of the hijackers of American Airlines Flight 77 (which crashed into the Pentagon) stayed at various motels in the Laurel area, including the Budget Host Valencia and Pin-Del motels in Howard County just north of the city limits. The wing of the Valencia where they stayed was demolished, and a new Sleep Inn was constructed on the ground, which opened in April 2007.  They accessed the Internet through public computers at a Kinko's just south of the city limits. They also prepared for the hijacking by working out at a Gold's Gym; a report by FBI Director Robert S. Mueller III states the gym was in Laurel, while other sources list the location as Greenbelt, Maryland, several miles to the south.

On August 29, 2005, Laurel adopted Laurel, Mississippi, as a sister city to help with Hurricane Katrina relief and recovery. In the two years following adoption, "the government, businesses and residents of Laurel, Md. ... raised more than $20,000 for Laurel, Miss."

Historic sites
The following is a list of historic sites in Laurel and vicinity identified by the Maryland-National Capital Park and Planning Commission and / or National Register of Historic Places:

Geography
The city is situated on the bank of the Patuxent River, which was the power source for the cotton mills that were the early industry of the town.

The zip codes for the incorporated city of Laurel are 20707, 20708, 20709, 20725 and 20756. Although served by the Laurel post office, Montpelier is not within the city limits; the same is true of the unincorporated communities of Scaggsville and Whiskey Bottom in Howard County, and Maryland City and Russett in Anne Arundel County. A small section of ZIP Code 20707 is located in Montgomery County.

Climate
As is typical of central Maryland, Laurel lies within the humid subtropical climate zone, featuring hot humid summers and cool to mild winters with high annual precipitation. Laurel lies within USDA plant hardiness zones 7 and 8.

Demographics

For statistical reporting, the Census Bureau identifies four adjacent unincorporated areas:
 West Laurel (upper west)
 North Laurel
 Maryland City (to the east)
 South Laurel

2010 census
As of the census of 2010, there were 25,115 people, 10,498 households, and 5,695 families residing in the city. The racial makeup of the city was 30.1% White, 48.9% African American, 0.4% Native American, 9.2% Asian, 0.1% Pacific Islander, 7.6% from other races, and 3.8% from two or more races. Hispanic or Latino people of any race were 15.5% of the population.

There were 10,498 households, of which 30.7% had children under the age of 18 living with them, 33.4% were married couples living together, 15.7% had a female householder with no husband present, 5.2% had a male householder with no wife present, and 45.8% were non-families. 37.6% of all households were made up of individuals, and 6.1% had someone living alone who was 65 years of age or older. The average household size was 2.37 and the average family size was 3.19.

The median age in the city was 33.7 years. 22.6% of residents were under the age of 18; 9.5% were between the ages of 18 and 24; 37.2% were from 25 to 44; 23.8% were from 45 to 64; and 7% were 65 years of age or older. The gender makeup of the city was 47.7% male and 52.3% female.

2000 census
As of the census of 2000, there were 19,960 people, 8,931 households, and 4,635 families residing in the city. The racial makeup of the city was 52.24% White, 34.50% African American, 0.38% Native American, 6.89% Asian, 0.21% Pacific Islander, 2.30% from other races, and 3.47% from two or more races. Hispanic or Latino people of any race were 6.24% of the population.

There were 8,931 households, of which 26.7% had children under the age of 18, 33.9% were married couples living together, 13.3% had a female householder with no husband present, and 48.1% were non-families. 37.4% of all households were made up of individuals, and 5.2% had someone living alone who was 65 years of age or older. The average household size was 2.22 and the average family size was 2.97.

In the city, the population was spread out, with 22.0% under the age of 18, 8.6% from 18 to 24, 42.9% from 25 to 44, 19.7% from 45 to 64, and 6.7% who were 65 years of age or older. The median age was 34 years. For every 100 females, there were 93.2 males. For every 100 females age 18 and over, there were 90.3 males.

The median income for a household in the city was $49,415, and the median income for a family was $58,552. Males had a median income of $37,966 versus $35,614 for females. The per capita income for the city was $26,717. About 4.3% of families and 6.4% of the population were below the poverty line, including 7.8% of those under age 18 and 6.4% of those age 65 or over.

Transportation

Roads and highways

The most prominent highway serving Laurel is Interstate 95, which skims the western edge of the city. Access from I-95 to Laurel is provided by Maryland Route 198, which also intersects U.S. Route 1 in the center of the city, Maryland Route 197 just east of downtown, and the Baltimore-Washington Parkway just east of the city limits.

Other major state roads in Laurel are MD 216, which connects the city with southern Howard County, and MD 206. The eastern terminus of MD 200 (the Intercounty Connector) lies just south of the city limits along U.S. Route 1 and connects Laurel with Gaithersburg.

Public transport

Two MARC train stations on the Camden Line to Baltimore and Washington, D.C. are located in Laurel: Laurel Station and Laurel Racetrack Station, the latter with minimal service. Laurel Station is a particularly notable example of the stations designed by E. Francis Baldwin for the Baltimore and Ohio Railroad.

The Washington Metropolitan Area Transit Authority (WMATA) Metrobus service provides four routes (87, 89, 89M, and Z7) into Laurel, and local RTA bus service is available.  Several taxicab and shuttle services also support the region.

Air transportation
Suburban Airport was located on Brock Bridge Road, just over the Anne Arundel County border. For decades the airport provided general aviation access for medivac helicopters, flight training, business travelers, and served as a relief airport for light traffic into and out of the two major regional airports. This airport closed in 2017.

The major airports currently serving the Laurel area are Baltimore-Washington International Thurgood Marshall Airport in adjacent Anne Arundel County, and Ronald Reagan Washington National Airport in Arlington, Virginia near downtown Washington, D.C.

Emergency services

The Laurel Police Department and the Prince George's County Police Department are the principal providers of the region's police officers. The Maryland State Police patrol US 1, MD 198, and Interstate 95, which pass through the area, and the United States Park Police patrol the Baltimore-Washington Parkway and its connectors.

PG County Police Department District 6 Station in Beltsville CDP serves unincorporated areas near Laurel, and the City of Laurel itself is within the station's beat map.

The primary emergency services providers for the City of Laurel and surrounding parts of Prince George's County are the Laurel Volunteer Fire Department (Company 10) and the Laurel Volunteer Rescue Squad (Company 49). Both companies are part of the Prince George's County Fire/EMS Department.

The Laurel Volunteer Fire Department was formed in 1902. Today the department is located at 7411 Cherry Lane. Volunteer staffing is supplemented by four career personnel from 7:00am to 3:00pm Monday through Friday excluding holidays. The company operates three fire engines (Engine 101, Engine 103, and Engine 104); and an aerial tower (Tower 10). Ambulance service began December 11, 2006. A paramedic unit staffed by two career personnel is also assigned to Company 10.

The Laurel Volunteer Rescue Squad was formed in 1952. Today the department is located at 14910 Bowie Road. Volunteer staffing is supplemented by four career personnel from 7:00am to 3:00pm Monday through Friday excluding holidays. The company operates one heavy rescue squad, one rescue-engine, three basic life support ambulances, and a swiftwater rescue team.

The University of Maryland Laurel Medical Center, built in 1978 as the Greater Laurel-Beltsville Hospital, and now managed by the University of Maryland Medical System, is located on Van Dusen Road. While it transitions to a full medical center to be built on the same campus, this facility currently provides emergency and outpatient services, wound care, hyperbaric medicine, primary care, and pain management, among other services.

Government

Municipal

Laurel is governed by a five-member city council and a mayor. There are two political wards in the city. The first ward is generally the area north of Maryland Route 198 and the second ward is to the south. Two council members are elected from each ward, and a council member is elected at large by residents of both wards.  City Council candidates must reside in Laurel a year before their election and during their full term of office. Similarly, mayoral candidates must reside in the city for at least two years prior to their election.

Nonpartisan citywide elections are held every two years on the first Tuesday in November of the odd year.  Phelps Senior Center on the corner of Montgomery Street and 8th Street/St. Mary's Place is the polling place for Ward 1, and the Robert J. DiPietro Community Center on Cypress Road is the polling place for Ward 2 voters.  The next election, to select a mayor and city council members, will be held in November 2023 with elected individuals to take office at the second regular City Council meeting that follows.  Regular meetings are held on the second and fourth Mondays of each month.

The council elects one of its members to serve as president. The president of the city council presides over council meetings and can act in a limited capacity as mayor if the mayor is unavailable. Council members serve for two years each term; the mayor serves for four years.

Federal
The U.S. Postal Service operates the following post offices in the city limits: Laurel, Laurel Carrier Annex, and Laurel Commons (at Towne Centre at Laurel). Montpelier Post Office is in nearby South Laurel CDP.

Media and culture

Media
Television arrived in Laurel with the establishment of the first TV broadcast stations in Washington in 1946. For decades, Laurel has been served by the VHF TV channels 4 (WRC-TV / NBC), 5 (WTTG / FOX), 7 (WJLA-TV / ABC), and 9 (WUSA / CBS) from Washington; channels 2 (WMAR-TV / ABC), 11 (WBAL-TV / NBC), 13 (WJZ-TV / CBS), and 45 (WBFF / FOX) from Baltimore; plus Maryland Public Television from Annapolis and Baltimore. In addition, there are dozens of UHF TV stations from Washington, Baltimore and Annapolis. From these three cities, scores of AM and FM radio stations reach Laurel.

Laurel has one local newspaper, the Laurel Leader, and one mediumwave AM radio station, WACA 900, with an adult contemporary format.

With its location between Washington and Baltimore, Laurel is also served by their daily newspapers The Washington Post, The Washington Times and  The Baltimore Sun. Many Laurel residents also read a free newspaper, the Washington Examiner.

Arts

Local performing arts outlets include the Venus Theatre, Laurel Mill Playhouse, Central Maryland Chorale (formerly Laurel Oratorio Society) and Montpelier Arts Center, which also features an art gallery.  Another local exhibitor is the WSSC Art Gallery.

Events
The city government supports an annual LakeFest in May and Independence Day celebration each July.  Since 1981, the Laurel Board of Trade has sponsored a Main Street Festival (held on Saturday of Mother's Day weekend) each May, and since 1995 a RiverFest each October.  The Montpelier Mansion grounds have hosted an annual festival the first weekend in May since 1971, updated in 2007 to focus on an "herb, tea and arts" theme.

Education

Primary and secondary schools

Public schools within and serving the city limits
Prince George's County Public Schools serves residents within Laurel's city limits.

Many city residents are zoned to Laurel Elementary School or Scotchtown Hills Elementary School, both within the city limits. There are also residential portions of the city zoned to schools outside the city limits: Bond Mill Elementary School in West Laurel CDP, Deerfield Run Elementary School in South Laurel CDP, Oaklands Elementary School in South Laurel, and Vansville Elementary School in an unincorporated area near Beltsville. Two public middle schools, Dwight D. Eisenhower Middle School in South Laurel CDP and Martin Luther King Jr. Middle School in Beltsville CDP serve the actual city of Laurel. Laurel High School in the city limits serves the city of Laurel.

During the era of legally-required racial segregation of schools, black students from Laurel attended Lakeland High School in College Park in the period 1928–1950, and Fairmont Heights High School, then near Fairmount Heights, from 1950 to 1964; around 1964, legally-required racial segregation of schools ended.

Public schools nearby
Nearby elementary schools serving areas outside of the Laurel city limits include Bond Mill, Deerfield Run, James H. Harrison, Montpelier, Oaklands, and Scotchtown Hills Elementary Schools in Prince George's County; Brock Bridge and Maryland City Elementary Schools in Anne Arundel County; Burtonsville Elementary School in Montgomery County, and Forest Ridge, Gorman Crossing, Hammond, and Laurel Woods Elementary Schools in Howard County.

Areas near Laurel in adjacent counties are served by MacArthur and Meade Middle Schools in Anne Arundel County, Benjamin Banneker Middle School in Montgomery County, and Hammond, Patuxent Valley, and Murray Hill Middle Schools in Howard County.

Other public high schools which serve the adjacent areas outside Prince George's County include Meade High School in Anne Arundel County, Paint Branch High School in Montgomery County, and Atholton, Hammond and Reservoir High Schools in Howard County. In Howard County, a new high school is planned to built, said to be done by 2023. A notable magnet school in Prince George's County is Eleanor Roosevelt High School.

District of Columbia alternative school
District of Columbia Public Schools operates an alternative middle and high school near Laurel named Maya Angelou Academy.

Private schools
 Augsburg Academy – Christian Day School; age 4 through grade 9
 Faith Baptist Christian School – Pre-K through grade 8
 First Baptist School of Laurel – Pre-K through grade 8
 Julia Brown Montesorri School – Pre-K through grade 3
 Kiddie Academy of Laurel – for ages 6 weeks through 12 years
 Kiddies Kollege Christian Center – for ages 2 years through 5 years
 Laurel Baptist Academy – kindergarten through grade 12
 Pallotti Day Care Center – Catholic kindergarten
 St. Mary of the Mills School – Catholic kindergarten through grade 8
 St. Vincent Pallotti High School – Catholic high school

Colleges, universities, and trade schools
Prince George's Community College and Howard Community College share a campus in Laurel called the Laurel College Center.

Capitol Technology University is located south of Laurel.

The Anne Arundel County section of Laurel hosts the Woodland Job Corps Center.

Public libraries
Prince George's County Memorial Library System operates the Laurel Branch Library at the intersection of Seventh Street and Talbott Avenue.  The "Maryland City at Russett" branch of the Anne Arundel County Public Library and the Savage branch of the Howard County Public Library System are also available to Laurel area residents.

Sports and recreation
Laurel's Department of Parks & Recreation sponsors seasonal sports leagues for adults, with youth leagues in the area offered by Laurel Little League, Greater Laurel United Soccer Club (GLUSC), Laurel Soccer Club (LSC), and the Laurel Boys and Girls Club.  Events are held among eleven city parks, three athletic fields, and three community centers. The city also operates a municipal swimming pool and tennis courts. Four indoor facilities and seven outdoor facilities are available for private rental.

The Fairland Sports and Athletic Complex on the grounds of the Fairland Regional Park, southwest of the city limits, is operated by the Maryland-National Capital Park and Planning Commission.  These facilities offer a broad variety of activities including swimming, gymnastics, tennis, racquetball, weight training, child sitting, and massage therapy.

Also located within Fairland Regional Park, The Gardens Ice House skating facility offers three ice rinks for ice skating lessons, public skating, figure skating, hockey, speed skating, and curling.  Recent additional activities include basketball and lacrosse. The Gardens Ice House is also home to the Washington Jr. Nationals Tier III Junior A ice hockey team, playing in the Atlantic Junior Hockey League and the Tri-City Eagles that play for the Chesapeake Bay Hockey League as well as the Maryland Reapers, an indoor football franchise of the American Indoor Football League.

The Laurel Roller Skating Center, just north of the city limits, provides a location for public roller skating.

Notable people

Simon Cho – Olympic short track speed skater
Jim Clash – participatory adventure journalist
R. Orin Cornett – physicist, university professor, and administrator; inventor of a literacy system for the deaf known as Cued speech
Edith DeVoe – first black nurse admitted to the regular U.S. Navy; died from lung cancer at the Cherry Lane Nursing Center in Laurel
Future President Dwight D. Eisenhower and his wife Mamie Eisenhower – lived at Mrs. Ray's Boarding House at 327 Montgomery Street in June 1919 during the couple's third year of marriage
Christopher Emery – Chief Enterprise Architect of the U.S. Securities and Exchange Commission and former White House Usher
Marty Friedman – former Megadeth lead guitarist; attended Laurel High School in the 1970s
Kathleen Hanna – former Bikini Kill and current Le Tigre band member; attended O.W. Phair Elementary School in Laurel
Ernest Lyon – former United States Ambassador to Liberia, professor at Morgan State University, and founder of the Maryland Industrial and Agricultural Institute for Colored Youths in Laurel
Biz Markie – rap artist
Andrew Maynard – boxer; won the light heavyweight gold medal at the 1988 Summer Olympics; born in Laurel
Greg Merson – 2012 World Series of Poker Main Event winner
Yvonne Orji – actor and comedian
Visanthe Shiancoe – former National Football League tight end
Ron Turcotte – Hall of Fame race horse jockey who trained at Laurel Park race course in the late 1960s
DeWanda Wise – actor

See also
 Laurel Mall
 Oseh Shalom Synagogue
A.M. Kroop and Sons, Inc.

References

Further reading
 Describes local history.

External links

 Official website: City of Laurel, Maryland
 History of the City of Laurel, Maryland

 
Cities in Prince George's County, Maryland
Washington metropolitan area
Populated places established in 1870
1870 establishments in Maryland
Cities in Maryland
Cities in the Baltimore–Washington metropolitan area